Jorge Ivayr Rodrigues da Fonseca (born 30 October 1992) is a Santomean-born Portuguese judoka. He competed at the 2016 Summer Olympics in the men's 100 kg event, in which he was eliminated in the second round by Lukáš Krpálek. He won the gold medal at the 2019 World Judo Championships in Tokyo and in the 2021 World Judo Championships in Budapest. He won the bronze medal at the 2020 Summer Olympics in Tokyo.

Upon winning the medals in 2021, Jorge Fonseca questioned in his ironic speech to Adidas and Puma: "This medal I will dedicate to Adidas and Puma because they said I had no capacity to be a Puma representative. I dedicate this medal to Puma and Adidas leaders. I've already shown that I'm two-time world champion, third at the Olympic Games. Which status do I need to be sponsored by Adidas and Puma?"

Personal life
In 2015, after he got injured on his left knee ligament, doctors found a malignant tumor on his left leg. Later on, he won the battle against cancer.

References

External links
 
 
 
 

1992 births
Living people
Portuguese male judoka
Olympic judoka of Portugal
São Tomé and Príncipe emigrants to Portugal
Portuguese people of São Tomé and Príncipe descent
Judoka at the 2016 Summer Olympics
World judo champions
Judoka at the 2015 European Games
Judoka at the 2019 European Games
European Games medalists in judo
European Games silver medalists for Portugal
Medalists at the 2020 Summer Olympics
Judoka at the 2020 Summer Olympics
Olympic medalists in judo
Olympic bronze medalists for Portugal
Black Portuguese sportspeople